Samori David Toure (born March 24, 1998) is an American football wide receiver for the Green Bay Packers of the National Football League (NFL). He played college football at Montana before transferring to Nebraska.

Professional career
Toure was selected in the seventh round (258th overall) by the Green Bay Packers in the 2022 NFL Draft. He signed his rookie contract on May 6, 2022.

He made the initial 53-man roster to begin the 2022 season, but was inactive for the first six games. He saw his first NFL action on October 23, 2022, catching one pass for four yards in a Week 7 loss to the Washington Commanders. On October 30, he caught his first NFL touchdown, a 37-yard pass from Aaron Rodgers, during a week 8 loss to the Buffalo Bills.

References

External links
Green Bay Packers bio
Nebraska Cornhuskers bio
Montana Grizzlies bio

Living people
1998 births
American football wide receivers
Montana Grizzlies football players
Nebraska Cornhuskers football players
Green Bay Packers players
Players of American football from Portland, Oregon